Thomas Naughton (born 1952) is an Irish former Gaelic footballer who played for the Annaghdown club and at inter-county level with the Galway senior football team. He later served as a selector and manager.

Playing career

Naughton first played Gaelic football at juvenile and underage levels with the Annaghdown club. He eventually progressed to the club's senior team and claimed three Galway SFC titles in 1982, 1985 and 1987.

Naughton first appeared on the inter-county scene for Galway as a member of the minor team. He was an unused substitute when the minor team beat Kerry in the 1970 All-Ireland minor final replay. He progressed to the under-21 team and won an All-Ireland U21 medal in 1972. Naughton joined the Galway senior football team in 1973 and won the first of eight Connacht SFC medals in his debut season. He also made the first of three unsuccessful All-Ireland final appearances that year, losing to Cork before losing to Dublin in 1974 and 1983.

Naughton's only senior national title was a National League title in 1981. He also earned selection to the Connacht team in the Railway Cup and was named on the All-Star team in 1974.

Management career

In retirement from playing, Naughton became involved in team management and coaching. He was appointed manager of the Galway minor team in advance of the 1993 All-Ireland MFC, however, his tenure was short-lived after he received a two-year suspension after a controversial game against Roscommon. Naughton later served under team manager Joe Kernan as a selector with the Galway senior team.

Honours

Annaghdown
Galway Senior Football Championship: 1982, 1985, 1987

Galway
Connacht Senior Football Championship: 1973, 1974, 1976, 1982, 1983, 1984, 1986, 1987
National Football League: 1980–81
All-Ireland Under-21 Football Championship: 1972
Connacht Under-21 Football Championship: 1972
All-Ireland Minor Football Championship: 1970
Connacht Minor Football Championship: 1970

References

1952 births
Living people
Annaghdown Gaelic footballers
Galway inter-county Gaelic footballers
Connacht inter-provincial Gaelic footballers
Gaelic football selectors
Irish salespeople